Mount Ossa is a national park in Queensland, Australia, 838 km northwest of Brisbane.

There is rainforest with hoop pines.

See also

 Protected areas of Queensland

References 

National parks of Queensland
Protected areas established in 1994
North Queensland